Netgear, Inc. is an American computer networking company based in San Jose, California, with offices in about 22 other countries. It produces networking hardware for consumers, businesses, and service providers. The company operates in three business segments: retail, commercial, and as a service provider.

Netgear's products cover a variety of widely used technologies such as wireless (Wi-Fi, LTE and 5G), Ethernet and powerline, with a focus on reliability and ease-of-use. The products  include wired and wireless devices for broadband access and network connectivity, and are available in multiple configurations to address the needs of the end-users in each geographic region and sector in which the company's products are sold.

As of 2020, Netgear products are sold in approximately 24,000 retail locations around the globe, and through approximately 19,000 value-added resellers, as well as multiple major cable, mobile and wireline service providers around the world.

History 
Netgear was founded by Patrick Lo in 1996. Lo graduated from Brown University with a B.S. degree in electrical engineering. Prior to founding Netgear, Lo was a manager at Hewlett-Packard. Netgear received initial funding from Bay Networks.

The company was listed on the NASDAQ stock exchange in 2003.

Product range 

Netgear's focus is primarily on the networking market, with products for home and business use, as well as pro-gaming, including wired and wireless technology.
Netgear also has a wide range of Wifi Range Extenders

ProSAFE switches 
Netgear markets network products for the business sector, most notably the ProSAFE switch range. , Netgear provides limited lifetime warranties for ProSAFE products for as long as the original buyer owns the product. Currently focusing on Multimedia segment and business product.

Network appliances 

Netgear also markets network appliances for the business sector, including managed switches and wired and wireless VPN firewalls. In 2016, Netgear released its Orbi mesh Wi-Fi System, with models for business as well as household use. The system uses a Tri-band architecture, similar to the traditional dual-band, but with a dedicated 5 GHz connection between the router and a provided satellite. The addition of a second 5 GHz channel allows the network to distribute its traffic, easing congestion caused by the increasing number of 5 GHz compatible wireless devices present in many household networks. In September 2017, Netgear exited the VPN firewall product category. At CES 2021, the company unveiled the world's first WiFi 6E router that takes advantage of the 6 GHz frequency band in addition to the 5 GHz and 2.4 GHz bands. The 6 GHz frequency increases network capacity where there is high utilization of the 5 GHz and 2.4 GHz bands.

Network-attached storage 

Netgear sells NAS devices to small businesses and consumers under the product name ReadyNAS. With this storage hardware line, Netgear vies with competitors like Buffalo, Zyxel and HP. Netgear entered the storage market in May 2007 when it acquired Infrant (originator of the ReadyNAS line). In March 2009, Netgear began to offer an integrated online backup solution called the ReadyNAS Vault. In June 2022 all ReadyNAS product pages was removed and replaced with a link to warranty and support information. Netgear has not yet (August 2022) confirmed that they have withdrawn from the network connected storage market and discontinued the ReadyNAS product line.

Network surveillance cameras 

Netgear created home surveillance camera brand Arlo, which was spun out into a separate company in August 2018. Arlo is now publicly traded on the New York Stock Exchange.

Netgear chipsets 
Netgear uses Realtek chipsets which can run in monitor mode and perform wireless injection. For this function, a special driver is needed.

Manufacturing 
Netgear outsources all manufacturing to other electronics companies, including Askey Computer Corporation, Cameo Communications, Delta Networks, Flex, Foxconn, Taicang T&W Electronics, Pegatron Corporation, SerComm, Wistron Neweb Corporation and USI Electronics (Shenzhen).

Manufacturing occurs primarily in mainland China, Vietnam, and Indonesia with pilot and low-volume manufacturing in Taiwan on a select basis.

To maintain quality standards, Netgear has established its own product quality organization, based in Hong Kong and mainland China, that is responsible for auditing and inspecting process and product quality on the premises of ODMs and JDMs (Joint Development Manufacturers).

Netgear was unaffected by US President Donald Trump's 25% tariffs on Chinese imports. Because all manufacturing is outsourced, the company was able to shift its production lines from China to Vietnam, Thailand and Indonesia.

Product Security concerns 
In 2014, various Netgear products that were manufactured by SerComm were found to contain a backdoor that allowed unauthorized remote access to the affected devices. Netgear, along with other companies with products manufactured by SerComm that were affected by the aforementioned backdoor, issued firmware updates for some affected products. However, it was shortly found that the updates merely hid the backdoor but did not remove it.

A backdoor also existed on the DG834 series. Any person who can access the router using a web browser, can enable "debug" mode using  and then connect via Telnet directly to the router's embedded Linux system as 'root', which gives unfettered access to the router's operating system via its Busybox functionality. 

In January 2017, various Netgear products were found to be vulnerable to an exploit that allows third-party access to the router and the internal network and to turn the router into a botnet.

This vulnerability occurs when an attacker can access the internal network or when remote management is enabled on the router. Remote management is turned off by default; users can turn on remote management through advanced settings. Firmware fixes are currently available for the affected devices.

In 2020, a vulnerability was discovered that affected many Netgear home WiFi routers. The problem was in a web server built into the router's firmware. When launching the administration interface, the owner had to enter their password, which was not protected by security. The exploit was posted on GitHub. Netgear issued a security advisory and firmware update to address the issue.

See also 
 Bay Networks#Acquisition by Nortel
 Netgear DG834 (series)
 Netgear SC101
 Netgear WGR614L
 Netgear WNR3500L

References

External links 

 

 
American companies established in 1996
Computer companies established in 1996
1996 establishments in California
Companies listed on the Nasdaq
Computer storage companies
Manufacturing companies based in San Jose, California
Technology companies based in the San Francisco Bay Area
Networking companies of the United States
Networking hardware companies
Nortel
Routers (computing)
2003 initial public offerings
Computer companies of the United States